Eden Avital (born 25 March 1997) is an Israeli footballer who plays as a attacking midfielder for the French football club Soyaux and for the Israeli national team. She has previously played in Israel for the Girls Football Academy, ASA Tel Aviv, and Kiryat Gat as well as in France for Albi.

Club career

Girls Football Academy

ASA Tel Aviv
Avital grew up in ASA Tel Aviv, and was noticed when she scored 27 league goals for the club in the 2015–16 Ligat Nashim season.

Kiryat Gat
In the summer before the 2018–19 Ligat Nashim season, Avital joined Ligat Nashim defending champion Kiryat Gat. The club took part in the 2018–19 UEFA Women's Champions League qualifying round, finishing 3rd in the group. Avital took part in all three matches: a 1–0 loss to Spartak Subotica, a 3–0 loss to Basel, and a 4–4 draw with Breznica in which she scored the second goal. The club ended the domestic season as runners-up to the title, finishing 3 points behind Avital's previous club ASA Tel Aviv, with which they drew 1–1 three rounds before the end of the season.

Albi
In October 2019, Avital joined French Division 2 Féminine club Albi. She made her professional debut for the club against AS Domératoise in the first round of the 2019–20 Coupe de France Féminine and scored a penalty for the third goal of the 5–0 victory. The next week, she made her first league appearance, playing 70 minutes in a 5–0 loss to Issy. She scored her first league goals for the club a couple of months later, scoring a brace in a 2–1 victory over Toulouse. During her season with the club, Avital scored two goals in eight league games and one goal in the two games she played in the Coupe de France.

Return to Kiryat Gat
In January 2021, Avital returned to join Kiryat Gat in Israel's Ligat Nashim due to the stoppage of the European championships due to the COVID-19 pandemic. They won the double that season, placing first in the 2020–21 Ligat Nashim and winning the 2020–21 Israeli Women's Cup. During the season, Avital scored 6 goals for the club: 3 in the league and 3 in the cup.

Soyaux
In July 2021, after her successful season with Kiryat Gat and following offers from clubs in Germany, Netherlands, Sweden, and Iceland, Avital returned to France and joined Soyaux from the Division 1 Féminine. In October 2021, she debuted for the club in the fifth round of the 2021–22 Division 1 Féminine, coming on as a substitute in the 59th minute of a 2–1 loss against Dijon. The next month, she made her first start, playing the first half of a league match against Guingamp which ended in a 2–2 draw. On 26 February 2022, Avital scored her first goal for the club, scoring a consolation goal in a 5–1 loss to Issy.

Style of play
Avital is a quick attacking midfielder, who likes playing on the wing.

International career
Avital made her debut for the Israeli senior national team in 2014, a month before her seventeenth birthday, against Switzerland. She appeared for the team during the 2019 FIFA Women's World Cup qualifying cycle.

International goals

Honors
 Ligat Nashim Champion: 2011–12, 2012–13, 2020–21
 Israeli Women's Cup Winner: 2011–12, 2016–17, 2020–21

References

External links
 
 
 
 

1997 births
Living people
Jewish Israeli sportspeople
ASJ Soyaux-Charente players
Israeli women's footballers
Ligat Nashim players
Israel women's international footballers
Women's association football midfielders
Footballers from Tel Aviv
Israeli expatriate women's footballers
Israeli expatriate sportspeople in France
Expatriate women's footballers in France